Shelly Hruska is a Canadian Metis, a former ringette and bandy player, coach, and teacher from Winnipeg, Manitoba. Hruska helped lead Team Canada twice to victory in the World Ringette Championships. Hruska was inducted into the Ringette Manitoba Hall of Fame in 2016–2017 under the category, "Player".

Hruska was a member of 2002 national team who won gold at the 2002 World Ringette Championships in Edmonton, Alberta, then became a member of the 2004 national team once again, competing at the 2004 World Ringette Championships in Stockholm, Sweden where she played a key role on the team which won the silver. In 2010, Hruska helped the Canada women's national bandy team to a 4th place finish overall at the 2010 Women's Bandy World Championship.

Early life
At a young age, Hruska was involved in many sports, including ballet, tap dancing, softball, baseball, figure skating, and ringette. Having originally learned to skate on figure skates, Hruska's parents enrolled her in power skating to teach her to skate on hockey skates. Growing up in Winnipeg, Hruska joined a ringette team, where she enjoyed the team's cooperation, closeness, and team spirit. Hruska made A-level ringette teams in Winnipeg and eventually became a strong ringette player by the age of 14.

Playing career

Ringette
At the age of 15, Hruska made the APFG Sixers, an AA provincial ringette team. Hruska and the Sixers won the provincial championships and went on to represent Manitoba at the national ringette championships known as the Canadian Ringette Championships. Hruska was continually asked to represent Manitoba every year that followed, eventually helping Team Manitoba capture silver at the 1999 Canada Winter Games.

As her playing career continued, she tried out for Team Canada and made the team in time for the 2002 World Ringette Championships in Edmonton, Alberta where Team Canada won gold defeating Finland 3-1. Hruska represented Team Canada once again at the 2004 World Ringette Championships in Stockholm, Sweden, where she was a key player in their victory.

Women's bandy

In 2009 Hruska helped Team Canada capture 5th place at the Women's Bandy World Championship.

Personal life
In her personal time Hruska is a certified Level 2 ringette coach and an instructor at the Lisa Brown Ringette Retreat in Calgary, Alberta. Hruska also acts as a motivational speaker to inspire Aboriginal and non-Aboriginal communities while promoting a healthy active lifestyle and its benefits.

Awards & Achievements

References

Living people
Métis sportspeople
Ringette players
Bandy players
Year of birth missing (living people)
Canadian sportswomen